Talwandi Jattan is a village in Shaheed Bhagat Singh Nagar district of Punjab State, India. The village is administrated by Sarpanch an elected representative of the village.

Demography 
As of 2011, Talwandi Jattan has a total number of 188 houses and population of 818 of which 418 include are males while 400 are females according to the report published by Census India in 2011. The literacy rate of Talwandi Jattan is 87.43%, higher than the state average of 75.84%. The population of children under the age of 6 years is 78 which is 9.54% of total population of Talwandi Jattan, and child sex ratio is approximately 814 as compared to Punjab state average of 846.

Most of the people are from Schedule Caste which constitutes 53.03% of total population in Talwandi Jattan. The town does not have any Schedule Tribe population so far.

As per the report published by Census India in 2011, 286 people were engaged in work activities out of the total population of Talwandi Jattan which includes 220 males and 86 females. According to census survey report 2011, 61.54% workers describe their work as main work and 38.46% workers are involved in Marginal activity providing livelihood for less than 6 months.

Education 
The village has a Punjabi medium, co-ed primary school founded in 1932. The schools provide mid-day meal which prepared in school premises as per Indian Midday Meal Scheme. The school provide free education to children between the ages of 6 and 14 as per Right of Children to Free and Compulsory Education Act. Sikh National College Banga and Amardeep Singh Shergill Memorial college Mukandpur are the nearest colleges.

Landmarks and history  
In 1767 a battle was fought by Lodria Singh, Godria Singh and Roop Kaur against Shamas Khan who abducted a girl from Behram. The Sikh soldiers who got martyrdom in the battle were cremated here. A shrine Gurudwara Shahidganj was built at the same place where the soldiers who died in the battle, were cremated (not to be confused with Gurudwara Shahid Ganj in Fatehgarh Sahib). A religious fair held at the Gurdwara on birthdays of Sikh gurus and other occasions, which attended by people of all religions.

Transport 

See also 
List of villages in India

References

External links 
 Tourism of Punjab
 Census of Punjab
 Locality Based PINCode

Villages in Shaheed Bhagat Singh Nagar district